Alfredo Binda (11 August 1902 – 19 July 1986) was an Italian road cyclist of the 1920s and 1930s. He was the first to win five editions of the Giro d'Italia, and a three-time world champion. In addition he won Milan–San Remo twice, and the Tour of Lombardy four times.

Later he would manage the Italian National team. Under him, Fausto Coppi, Gino Bartali and Gastone Nencini all triumphed at the Tour de France.

Early life
Binda was born in Cittiglio near Varese but moved to Nice, in southern France as a teenager. He found work with his uncle as an apprentice plasterer, but he and brother Primo spent their free time cycling. He began racing in September 1921, aged 19. He won his first race (though he was subsequently disqualified) and it was clear from the outset that he was immensely gifted as both time trialist and climber.

Binda was a trained trumpet player, and was nicknamed "Trombettiere di Cittiglio" ("The Trumpeter of Cittiglio").

Cycling career
Enticed by a 500 lire King of the Mountains prize on the Ghisallo climb, Binda rode from Nice to Milan in order to compete in the 1924 Tour of Lombardy. He won the prize, finished fourth in the race, and was immediately offered a contract with the Legnano professional team.

The 1925 Giro d'Italia was to be the last of the legendary campionissimo Costante Girardengo. All of Italy hoped he would prevail, and his defeat at the hands of Binda, a 23-year-old Giro debutant, was deeply unpopular. In the event Girardengo resolved to continue racing, and the two of them developed a caustic, deeply personal rivalry. As Girardengo's powers waned, Italians looked to Domenico Piemontesi to usurp Binda but, much like everyone else, he was hopelessly out of his depth against the fuoriclasse.

In 1929 Girardengo "discovered" a prodigiously strong track rider from Veneto, Learco Guerra. He famously anointed him as his heir apparent, a new "anti-Binda". Guerra closely resembled Girardengo as a cyclist, and was hugely popular. He enjoyed the support of the Italian Fascist Party, and by extension the press and wider sporting public. Binda, on the other hand, famously declared that he'd no interest in producing spettacolo. Rather he was simply in the business of winning bike races, and each time he defeated Guerra the Italian public's antipathy grew. Whilst Guerra was homespun, expansive and open, Binda was perceived as cold and detached, pompous even.

So dominant was he that the Gazzetta dello Sport offered him 22,500 lire to miss the Giro of 1930. Instead, he took part in that year's Tour de France, winning two stages. Not until 1932, when he won a third Cycling World Championship in Rome, did the public start to warm to him. By then he had redefined both training and racing methodology, and was arguably the greatest cyclist ever to have lived.

All told he won the Giro a record five times in 1925, 1927, 1928, 1929 and 1933 (1933 was also the first year the Giro held a "King of the Mountains" competition, which Binda won too). Besides the overall victories he won 41 stages (a record only broken in 2003 by Mario Cipollini). In 1927, he won 12 out of 15 stages, and in 1929 he won 8 consecutive stages.

In the World Championships, Binda was also very successful. He won the title three times in 1927, 1930 and 1932 (a record later equalled by Rik Van Steenbergen, Eddy Merckx, Óscar Freire and Peter Sagan). In addition, he placed third in 1929. By the time he retired he had won over 120 races, including the Italian Championships four times.

Società Ciclistica Alfredo Binda is named in his honor.

Major results
Source:

1924
 1st  Overall Tour du Sud-Est
1st Stage 3
 1st Mont Faron
 4th Giro di Lombardia
1925
 1st  Overall Giro d'Italia
1st Stage 6
 1st Giro di Lombardia
 2nd Road race, National Road Championships
 2nd Giro dell'Emilia
 3rd Giro del Piemonte
1926
 1st  Road race, National Road Championships
 1st Giro di Lombardia
 1st Giro del Piemonte
 1st Coppa Città di Milazzo
 2nd Overall Giro d'Italia
1st Stages 3, 6, 7, 9, 11 & 12
 2nd Giro del Veneto
 3rd Giro della Romagna
1927
 1st  Road race, UCI Road World Championships
 1st  Road race, National Road Championships
 1st  Overall Giro d'Italia
1st Stages 1–3, 5–10, 12, 14 & 15 (Record for the Giro d'Italia)
 1st Giro di Lombardia
 1st Giro del Piemonte
 2nd Milan–San Remo
 2nd Giro dell'Emilia
1928
 1st  Road race, National Road Championships
 1st  Overall Giro d'Italia
1st Stages 2, 3, 4, 5, 10 & 11
 1st Giro del Veneto
 1st Rund um Köln
 1st Predappio Alta - Roma
 2nd Milan–San Remo
 5th Groβer Sachsenpreis
1929
 1st  Road race, National Road Championships
 1st  Overall Giro d'Italia
1st Stages 2, 3, 4, 5, 6, 7, 8 & 9
 1st Milan–San Remo
 1st Giro della Romagna
 1st Predappio Alta - Roma
 2nd Giro del Piemonte
 3rd  Road race, UCI Road World Championships
1930
 1st  Road race, UCI Road World Championships
 Tour de France
1st Stages 8 & 9
 2nd Road race, National Road Championships
 2nd Giro di Lombardia
 2nd Giro di Toscana
1931
 1st Milan–San Remo
 1st Giro di Lombardia
 Giro d'Italia
1st Stages 3 & 4
 6th Road race, UCI Road World Championships
1932
 1st  Road race, UCI Road World Championships
 1st GP Industria & Artigianato di Larciano
 1st  (with Raffaele di Paco)
 2nd Milan–San Remo
 2nd Giro di Campania
 3rd Road race, National Road Championships
 3rd Giro di Toscana
 7th Overall Giro d'Italia
1933
 1st  Overall Giro d'Italia
1st Mountains classification
1st Stages 2, 8, 9, 10, 13 (ITT) & 17
 6th Road race, UCI Road World Championships
 6th Milan–San Remo

See also
 Legends of Italian sport - Walk of Fame

References

External links 

Complete Palmarès
Alfredo Binda: The Giro's first superstar
Alfredo Binda Cycling Team

Alfredo Binda at CycleToscana.com

Italian male cyclists
UCI Road World Champions (elite men)
Giro d'Italia winners
Italian Giro d'Italia stage winners
Italian Tour de France stage winners
People from Cittiglio
1902 births
1986 deaths
Cyclists from the Province of Varese